IPGCL Gas Turbine Power Station was a defunct power plant that was located at Delhi. The power plant was one of the gas based power plants of IPGCL. Source of water for the power plant was the Yamuna River.

Capacity 
IPGCL Gas Turbine Power Station had an installed capacity of 270 MW.
The power plant had nine power generating units.
 Six GT Units of 30 MW each. These units were commissioned during period 1985–86.
 Three ST Unit of 30 MW. These units were commissioned during period 1995–96.

References

External links
 Power Stations in Delhi

Natural gas-fired power stations in Delhi
Energy infrastructure completed in 1985
Energy infrastructure completed in 1995
1985 establishments in Delhi
20th-century architecture in India